Rajneeshpuram was a religious intentional community in the northwest United States, located in Wasco County, Oregon. Incorporated as a city between 1981 and 1988, its population consisted entirely of Rajneeshees, followers of the spiritual teacher Rajneesh, later known as Osho.

Its citizens and leaders were responsible for launching the 1984 Rajneeshee bioterror attacks, as well as the planned 1985 Rajneeshee assassination plot, in which they conspired to assassinate Charles Turner, the United States Attorney for the District of Oregon.

Settlement

Tensions with the public and threatened punitive action by Indian authorities originally motivated the founders and leaders of the Rajneeshee movement, Bhagwan Shri Rajneesh and Ma Anand Sheela, to leave India and begin a new religious settlement in the United States. Discussions of this new settlement began as early as 1980, but Rajneesh did not agree to relocate until May 1981, when he travelled to the United States on a tourist visa, ostensibly for medical purposes.  Rajneeshpuram was planned from the beginning as a home for Rajneesh's followers in the United States, most of whom were told to sell all of their belongings before moving there.  The decision to register as a town was made primarily so that Rajneesh could govern over his followers without attracting attention from authorities.

Rajneeshpuram was on the site of a  central Oregon property known as the Big Muddy Ranch, near Antelope, which was purchased by Sheela's husband, John Shelfer, in 1981 for $5.75 million, ($ in today's dollars). Within a year of arriving, the commune's leaders had become embroiled in a series of legal battles with their neighbors, primarily over land use. They had initially stated that they were planning to create a small agricultural community, their land being zoned for agricultural use, but it soon became apparent that they wanted to establish the kind of infrastructure and services normally associated with a town.

Within three years, the neo-sannyasins (Rajneesh's followers, also termed Rajneeshees in contemporaneous press reports) developed a community, turning the ranch from an empty rural property into a city of up to 7,000 people, complete with typical urban infrastructure such as a fire department, police, restaurants, malls, townhouses, a  airstrip, a public transport system using buses, a sewage reclamation plant, a reservoir, and a post office with the ZIP code 97741.  It is thought that the actual population during this time was potentially much higher than they claimed, and the neo-sannyasins may have gone as far as to hide beds and citizens during investigations.  Various legal conflicts, primarily over land use, escalated to bitter hostility between the commune and local residents, and the commune was subject to sustained and coordinated pressures from various coalitions of Oregon residents over the length of its existence.

Increasing tensions

The town of Antelope, Oregon, became a focal point of the conflict. It was the nearest town to the ranch, and had a population of under 60. Initially, Rajneesh's followers had purchased only a small number of lots in Antelope. After the activist group 1000 Friends of Oregon became involved, Antelope denied the sannyasins a business permit for their mail-order operation, and more sannyasins moved into the town. In April 1982, Antelope held a vote to disincorporate itself, to prevent itself being taken over. By this time, there were enough Rajneeshee residents to defeat the measure. In May 1982, the residents of the Rancho Rajneesh commune voted to incorporate the separate city of Rajneeshpuram on the ranch. Apart from the control of Antelope and the land-use question, there were other disputes. The commune leadership took an aggressive stance on many issues and initiated litigation against various groups and individuals.

The June 1983 bombing of Hotel Rajneesh, a Rajneeshee-owned hotel in Portland, by the Islamist militant group Jamaat ul-Fuqra further heightened tensions. The display of semi-automatic weapons acquired by the Rajneeshpuram Peace Force created an image of imminent violence. Rumors arose of the National Guard being called in to arrest Rajneesh. At the same time, the commune was embroiled in a range of legal disputes. Oregon Attorney General David B. Frohnmayer maintained that the city was essentially an arm of a religious organization, and that its incorporation thus violated the principle of separation of church and state. 1000 Friends of Oregon claimed that the city violated state land-use laws. In 1983, a lawsuit was filed by the State of Oregon to invalidate the city's incorporation, and many attempts to expand the city further were legally blocked, prompting followers to attempt to build in nearby Antelope, which was briefly named Rajneesh, when sufficient numbers of Rajneeshees registered to vote there and won a referendum on the subject.

The Rajneeshpuram residents believed that the wider Oregonian community was both bigoted and suffered from religious intolerance. According to Carl Latkin, Rajneesh's followers had made peaceful overtures to the local community when they first arrived in Oregon. As Rajneeshpuram grew in size, heightened tensions led certain fundamentalist Christian church leaders to denounce Rajneesh, the commune, and his followers. Petitions were circulated aimed at ridding the state of the perceived menace. Letters to state newspapers reviled the Rajneeshees, one of them likening Rajneeshpuram to another Sodom and Gomorrah, another referring to them as a "cancer in our midst." In time, circulars mixing "hunting humor" with dehumanizing characterizations of Rajneeshees began to appear at gun clubs, turkey shoots and other gatherings; one of these, circulated widely over the Northwest, declared "an open season on the central eastern Rajneesh, known locally as the Red Rats or Red Vermin."

As Rajneesh himself did not speak in public during this period, and until October 1984 gave few interviews, his secretary and chief spokesperson Ma Anand Sheela (Sheela Silverman) became, for practical purposes, the leader of the commune. She did little to defuse the conflict, employing a crude, caustic and defensive speaking style that exacerbated hostilities and attracted media attention. On September 14, 1985, Sheela and 15 to 20 other top officials abruptly left Rajneeshpuram. The following week, Rajneesh convened press conferences and publicly accused Sheela and her team of having committed crimes within and outside the commune. The subsequent criminal investigation, the largest in Oregon history, confirmed that a secretive group had, unbeknownst to both government officials and nearly all Rajneeshpuram residents, engaged in a variety of criminal activities, including the attempted murder of Rajneesh's physician, wiretapping and bugging within the commune and within Rajneesh's home, poisonings of two public officials, and arson.

Role in 1984 bioterror attack 

In 1984, Sheela Silverman coordinated an attack alongside Rajneeshpuram citizens to infect the salad bars of at least ten restaurants in the county seat of Wasco County with salmonella, in an attempt to incapacitate the voting population of the city so that their own candidates would win the 1984 Wasco County elections.  While 751 people, including several Wasco County public officials, were infected, and 45 people were hospitalized, there were no fatalities. This incident is still regarded as the single largest biological warfare attack in United States history.

Local residents, suspecting Rajneeshpuram to be involved in the poisonings, turned out in droves on election day to prevent them from winning any county positions.  The Rajneeshees eventually withdrew their candidate from the November 1984 ballot, rendering their plot unsuccessful.

Air Rajneesh and Big Muddy Ranch Airport 

In the mid-1980s members of the Rajneeshee commune constructed Big Muddy Ranch Airport to ferry supplies and passengers to Rajneeshpuram. To ferry the actual cargo and passengers the Rajneeshees created an airline called Air Rajneesh which operated large commuter aircraft out of Big Muddy Ranch Airport.

Outcome

Sheela was extradited from West Germany and imprisoned for attempted murder, assault, wiretapping, arson, immigration fraud, and her role in the bioterror attack.  During the next few years the movement also came under investigation for multiple other felonies:

 Arson: On January 14, 1985, the Wasco County Planning Department office, which held the files on long-running disputes involving the Rajneeshees, was set on fire. The fire extensively damaged the office and destroyed one-third to one-half of the county's files.
 Attempted Murder: Several commune members plotted to kill Charles H. Turner, the U.S. state attorney in Portland, and several other persons considered to be Rajneeshee enemies, in the 1985 Rajneeshee assassination plot. Others were on the “hit list” including Dave Frohnmayer, the Oregon Attorney General who first started to publicly dispute the Rajneesh activities.
 Immigration Fraud:  Despite originally travelling to the United States claiming medical reasons, Rajneesh never sought medical treatment during his residence, and later admitted to counts of immigration fraud.
 Voting Fraud:  The Rajneeshpuram community attempted to sway local elections in their favor in a variety of methods, including the "Share-a-Home" program, in which they transported thousands of homeless people to Rajneeshpuram and attempted to register them to vote to inflate the constituency of voters for the group's candidates.  The Wasco county clerk countered this attempt by enforcing a regulation that required all new voters to submit their qualifications when registering to vote.
 Currency and Drug Smuggling

These criminal activities had, according to the Office of the Attorney General, begun in the spring of 1984, three years after the establishment of the commune. Rajneesh himself was accused of immigration violations, to which he entered an Alford plea. As part of his plea bargain, he agreed to leave the United States and eventually returned to Pune, India. His followers left Oregon shortly afterwards.

The increasing ability and capacity of local and state regulators to actively limit the development of Rajneeshpuram this way was one major factor that led to the sudden collapse of the commune in September and October 1985.

The legal standing of Rajneeshpuram remained ambiguous. In the church/state suit, Federal Judge Helen J. Frye ruled against Rajneeshpuram in late 1985, a decision that was not contested, since it came too late to be of practical significance. The Oregon courts, however, eventually found in favor of the city, with the Court of Appeals determining in 1986 that incorporation had not violated the state planning system's agricultural land goals. The Oregon Supreme Court ended litigation in 1987, leaving Rajneeshpuram empty and bankrupt, but legal within Oregon law.

Originally listed for over $28 million in 1985, the ranch was sold at a sheriff's auction for $4.5 million in late 1988 to Connecticut General Life Insurance Company, the sole bidder.

Washington Family Ranch
Dennis R. Washington's firm Washington Construction purchased The Big Muddy Ranch for $3.6 million in 1991. Washington attempted to run the ranch for profit, and also unsuccessfully negotiated with the state to turn it into a state park.

In 1996, Washington donated the ranch to Young Life, a Christian youth organization. Since 1999, Young Life has operated a summer camp there, first as the WildHorse Canyon Camp, later as the Washington Family Ranch.

There are two camps on the property today. The primary camp, Washington Family Ranch: Canyon serves high school students, while the smaller camp, Washington Family Ranch: Creekside, primarily serves middle school students.

The Big Muddy Ranch Airport is also located there.

See also 

 Wild Wild Country, a 2018 documentary on the Rajneesh disputes
 Ecclesia Athletic Association, another contemporaneous Oregon organization which drew comparisons to Rajneeshpuram

Notes

References 

 Includes studies by Susan J. Palmer, Lewis F. Carter, Roy Wallis, Carl Latkin, Ronald O. Clarke and others previously published in various academic journals.)
.
.
.
.
.
.
.
. (Includes a 135-page section on Rajneeshpuram previously published in two parts in The New Yorker magazine, Sept. 22 and Sept. 29, 1986 editions.)
.
.
.
.
. ASIN B000DZUH6E
.
.
.
. ASIN B0006YPC9O

External links 
Building Oregon: Images of Rajneeshpuram
Photographs of the "First Annual World Celebration" in Rajneeshpuram, 1982

Rajneeshpuram – 2012 documentary produced by Oregon Public Broadcasting (1 hour)

 2012 documentary produced by Oregon Public Broadcasting
. A 2018 Netflix documentary series on Rajneesh, focusing on Rajneeshpuram and the controversies surrounding it.
"Rajneeshpuram, An Experiment To Provoke God" 1991 documentary film by M. R. Hilow 
"Rajneeshpuram, An Experiment To Provoke God" University library storage and publication listing
"Rajneeshpuram, An Experiment To Provoke God", 1991 historical documentary film that traces the origins of Rajneeshpuram and its inhabitants

1980s establishments in Oregon
Former cities in Oregon
Former populated places in Wasco County, Oregon
Intentional communities in the United States
Land use in Oregon
Rajneesh movement
Religion in the Pacific Northwest
Scandals in Oregon
Politically motivated migrations